Flaming Star may refer to:

 Flaming Star, a 1960 western film starring Elvis Presley
 "Flaming Star" (song), a song by Elvis Presley, the title song from the above-mentioned film
 Flaming Star (EP), an EP by Elvis Presley, containing two songs from the above-mentioned film

Other 
Flaming Star, a novel by Clair Huffaker
Flaming Star, a 2001 album by Sally Oldfield
"Flaming Star", a 1983 song by Edward Reekers

See also 
 Elvis Sings Flaming Star, a 1968 album by Elvis Presley